Edmund or Edmond Roche may refer to: 
 Edmund Roche (Sinn Féin politician), elected to the Dáil Éireann
 Edmond Roche, 1st Baron Fermoy, Irish politician in the British parliament
 Edmund Roche, 5th Baron Fermoy, British businessman
 Edmond Roche (poet), French poet, playwright, librettist and violinist